Lyubomir Popov (born 15 June 1967) is a Bulgarian alpine skier. He competed at the 1988, 1992, 1994 and the 1998 Winter Olympics.

References

External links
 

1967 births
Living people
Bulgarian male alpine skiers
Olympic alpine skiers of Bulgaria
Alpine skiers at the 1988 Winter Olympics
Alpine skiers at the 1992 Winter Olympics
Alpine skiers at the 1994 Winter Olympics
Alpine skiers at the 1998 Winter Olympics
People from Samokov
Sportspeople from Sofia Province